Happiness Is may refer to:

Film and television
Happiness Is (film), a 2009 documentary

Cartoons/Books
Happiness Is (cartoon), book series by Lisa Swerling & Ralph Lazar

Music

Albums
Happiness Is (Ray Conniff album) 1966, or the title track (by Paul Evans and Paul Parnes, best known for the Cleo award-winning commercial for Kent cigarettes)
Happiness Is (Taking Back Sunday album) 2014
Happiness Is, a jazz album by Enrico Rava

Songs
"Happiness Is", a 1967 song by actress Dora Bryan
"Happiness Is", a song written by the Addrisi Brothers
"Happiness Is", a 1966 single by Joe Sherman And The Arena Brass
"Happiness Is", a 1974 single by New York City
"Happiness Is", a song by The Verve Pipe from their 2001 album Underneath
"Happiness Is", a song by Violent Femmes from their 2000 album Freak Magnet
"Happiness is...", a single by Ami Suzuki

See also
Happiness Is in the Field (French: Le bonheur est dans le pré), a 1995 French comedy directed by Étienne Chatiliez
Happiness is a cigar called Hamlet, advertisement campaign
Happiness Is a Warm Blanket, Charlie Brown, a 2011 animated TV special
Happiness Is You, album by Johnny Cash 1966
Happiness... Is Not a Fish That You Can Catch, album by Canadian alternative rock band Our Lady Peace
Happiness Is the Road, album by Marillion 2008
"Happiness Is a Warm Gun", a song by the Beatles
"Happiness Is a Thing Called Joe" song written by Harold Arlen, 1943